Éric Struelens (born 3 November 1969) is a former Belgian professional basketball player.

Professional career
Struelens won the Belgian League championship 7 times (6 with  Racing Mechelen and 1 with Spirou Charleroi) and the Belgian Cup 4 times (3 with Mechelen and 1 with Charleroi). He also twice won the Player of the Year award in Belgium. 

Struelens then moved abroad, to Paris Basket Racing, in France, where he won the French League championship, before joining the Real Madrid in Spain. Struelens also won the Spanish League championship with Real Madrid.

Belgian national team
Struelens was a key player of the senior Belgian national basketball team. With Belgium, he played at the EuroBasket 1993.

References

External links
 FIBA Profile
 FIBA Europe Profile
 Spanish League Profile 

1969 births
Living people
Belgian expatriates in Greece
Belgian expatriate basketball people in Spain
Belgian men's basketball players
Brussels Basketball players
CB Girona players
Centers (basketball)
Liga ACB players
Panellinios B.C. players
Paris Racing Basket players
People from Watermael-Boitsfort
Power forwards (basketball)
Real Madrid Baloncesto players
R.C. Mechelen players
Spirou Charleroi players
Sportspeople from Brussels